Claire Yiu Ka-lei (born 10 August 1978), is a Hong Kong actress contracted to TVB.

Career
Yiu started her acting career after being the 2nd runner-up in the Miss Asia Pageant in 1998. After filming some ATV series, such as 海瑞鬥嚴嵩, and Ten Tigers of Guangdong (廣東十虎), she went over to TVB and filmed some minor roles in television dramas such as To Catch The Uncatchable and Healing Hands 3. She began to play more significant roles in television dramas such as To Grow with Love and Steps (TV series).

Personal life
Yiu is married with former ATV actor, Thomas Lam Cho-fai. Their daughter, Kyra, was born on 20 April 2009. Their son, Kyros, was born on 30 April 2012.

Filmography

ATV 
海瑞鬥嚴嵩 (1998)
Ten Tigers of Guangdong (1998)

TVB

Films 
 Blue Moon (2001)
 Psychedelic Cop (2002)
 Bless the Child (2003)
 Fate Fighter (2003)

References

1978 births
Living people
20th-century Hong Kong actresses
21st-century Hong Kong actresses
TVB veteran actors